Bivibranchia is a genus of halftooths from tropical South America, with five recognized species:
 Bivibranchia bimaculata Vari, 1985
 Bivibranchia fowleri (Steindachner, 1908)
 Bivibranchia notata Vari & Goulding, 1985
 Bivibranchia simulata Géry, Planquette & Le Bail, 1991
 Bivibranchia velox (C. H. Eigenmann & G. S. Myers, 1927)

References

Hemiodontidae
Characiformes genera
Taxa named by Carl H. Eigenmann
Fish of South America